Paddy Bedford (circa 1922 – 14 July 2007), aka "Goowoomji", was a contemporary Indigenous Australian artist from Warmun in the Kimberley, and one of eight Australian artists selected for an architectural commission for the Musée du quai Branly.

Life and family
Bedford was born in the East Kimberley around 1922 at a property which gave him his surname – Bedford Downs Station. The station's owner Paddy Quilty was the source of Bedford's given name, but Bedford's judgement of Quilty was at best forgiving, and could be harsh. Quilty was reputed to have been involved in a massacre of indigenous people in the region before Bedford's birth, and Bedford's response to an invitation to visit Quilty's grave was "Why should I go see that old fucking bastard?".

Life for Bedford, like his parents, was hard and shaped by the harsh racial politics of early 20th century Australia. His parents survived but were displaced by incidents that involved the killing of indigenous people. Bedford was at one stage sent to a leprosarium, despite not having leprosy. When he married Emily Watson and had children, the children were taken away to a mission.

Bedford, like many of the indigenous men in the Kimberley, worked as a stockman, but was paid in rations. When the law in 1969 required equal pay for black and white alike, station owners responded by laying off their indigenous workforce, including Bedford. He worked for a while on road building, but ended up forced on to welfare by injury.

Bedford is survived by an extended family, including two daughters.

Art
Bedford was familiar with body-painting as a young man. He commenced painting on canvas in around 1998, together with other artists from the Warmun / Turkey Creek locality, and encouraged by former gallerist Tony Oliver. Bedford was one several artists who own Jirrawun Arts, a company established to assist the development and sale of works by indigenous artists from parts of the Kimberley. Bedford was the subject of a major catalogue and retrospective at the Museum of Contemporary Art, Sydney in 2006–07. Bedford's art remains among Australia's most collectible and has decorated aircraft as part of Qantas’ Indigenous Flying Art series.

Bedford's painting is loosely representational of landscape, and was influenced by the work of Rover Thomas. Although, like much of central and western desert art, it is strongly influenced by traditional techniques and iconography, it also addresses black-white relationships and historical events in his country.

References

Further reading
David Edwards, 'Out of the Centre', The Blurb, no. 77, 2007
Jeremy Eccles, 'Jirrawun: A unique model for Aboriginal art', Art & Australia, vol. 44, no. 1, 2006
Linda Michael (ed.), Paddy Bedford, Museum of Contemporary Art, Sydney, 2006
Nicolas Rothwell, 'A dream of a studio', The Weekend Australian – Review, 21–22 July 2007, p. 9.

External links
Paddy Bedford at the Art Gallery of New South Wales
Paddy Bedford at the MCA, Sydney
Jirrawun Arts

Australian Aboriginal artists
Indigenous Australians from Western Australia
2007 deaths
Year of birth uncertain
1920s births
People from Warmun Community